Eupithecia perfica is a moth in the  family Geometridae. It is found in Brazil.

References

Moths described in 1929
perfica
Moths of South America